Eudora Alice Welty (April 13, 1909 – July 23, 2001) was an American short story writer, novelist and photographer who wrote about the American South. Her novel The Optimist's Daughter won the Pulitzer Prize in 1973. Welty received numerous awards, including the Presidential Medal of Freedom and the Order of the South. She was the first living author to have her works published by the Library of America. Her house in Jackson, Mississippi has been designated as a National Historic Landmark and is open to the public as a house museum.

Biography
Eudora Welty was born in Jackson, Mississippi, on April 13, 1909, the daughter of Christian Webb Welty (1879–1931) and Mary Chestina (Andrews) Welty (1883–1966). She grew up with younger brothers Edward Jefferson and Walter Andrews. Her mother was a schoolteacher. Welty soon developed a love of reading reinforced by her mother, who believed that "any room in our house, at any time in the day, was there to read in, or to be read to." Her father, who worked as an insurance executive, was intrigued by gadgets and machines and inspired in Welty a love of mechanical things. She later used technology for symbolism in her stories and also became an avid photographer, like her father.

She attended Central High School in Jackson. Near the time of her high school graduation, Welty moved with her family to a house built for them at 1119 Pinehurst Street, which remained her permanent address until her death. Wyatt C. Hedrick designed the Weltys' Tudor Revival-style home, which is now known as the Eudora Welty House and Garden.

Welty studied at the Mississippi State College for Women from 1925 to 1927, then transferred to the University of Wisconsin to complete her studies in English literature. At the suggestion of her father, she studied advertising at Columbia University. Because she graduated in the depths of the Great Depression, she struggled to find work in New York.

Soon after Welty returned to Jackson in 1931, her father died of leukemia. She took a job at a local radio station and wrote about Jackson society for the Memphis newspaper Commercial Appeal. In 1933, she began work for the Works Progress Administration. As a publicity agent, she collected stories, conducted interviews, and took photographs of daily life in Mississippi. She gained a wider view of Southern life and the human relationships that she drew from for her short stories. During this time she also held meetings in her house with fellow writers and friends, a group she called the Night-Blooming Cereus Club. Three years later, she left her job to become a full-time writer.

In 1936, she published "The Death of a Traveling Salesman" in the literary magazine Manuscript, and soon published stories in several other notable publications including The Sewanee Review and The New Yorker. She strengthened her place as an influential Southern writer when she published her first book of short stories, A Curtain of Green. Her new-found success won her a seat on the staff of The New York Times Book Review, as well as a Guggenheim Fellowship which enabled her to travel to France, England, Ireland, and Germany. While abroad, she spent some time as a resident lecturer at the universities of Oxford and Cambridge, becoming the first woman to be permitted into the hall of Peterhouse College. In 1960, she returned home to Jackson to care for her elderly mother and two brothers.

After Medgar Evers, field secretary of the NAACP in Mississippi, was assassinated, she published a story in The New Yorker, "Where Is the Voice Coming From?". She wrote it in the first person as the assassin.

In 1971, she published a collection of her photographs depicting the Great Depression, titled One Time, One Place. Two years later, she received the Pulitzer Prize for Fiction for her novel The Optimist's Daughter. She lectured at Harvard University, and eventually adapted her talks as a three-part memoir titled One Writer's Beginnings. She continued to live in her family house in Jackson until her death from natural causes on July 23, 2001. She is buried in Greenwood Cemetery in Jackson. Her headstone has a quote from The Optimist's Daughter: "For her life, any life, she had to believe, was nothing but the continuity of its love."

Throughout the 1970s, Welty carried on a lengthy correspondence with novelist Ross Macdonald, creator of the Lew Archer series of detective novels.

Photography
While Welty worked as a publicity agent for the Works Progress Administration, she took photographs of people from all economic and social classes in her spare time. From the early 1930s, her photographs show Mississippi's rural poor and the effects of the Great Depression. Collections of her photographs were published as One Time, One Place (1971) and Photographs (1989). Her photography was the basis for several of her short stories, including "Why I Live at the P.O.", which was inspired by a woman she photographed ironing in the back of a small post office. Although focused on her writing, Welty continued to take photographs until the 1950s.

Writing career and major works

Welty's first short story, "Death of a Traveling Salesman", was published in 1936. Her work attracted the attention of author Katherine Anne Porter, who became a mentor to her and wrote the foreword to Welty's first collection of short stories, A Curtain of Green, in 1941. The book established Welty as one of American literature's leading lights, and featured the stories "Why I Live at the P.O.", "Petrified Man", and the frequently anthologized "A Worn Path". Excited by the printing of Welty's works in publications such as The Atlantic Monthly, the Junior League of Jackson, of which Welty was a member, requested permission from the publishers to reprint some of her works. She eventually published over forty short stories, five novels, three works of non-fiction, and one children's book.

The short story "Why I Live at the P.O." was published in 1941, with two others, by The Atlantic Monthly. It was republished later that year in Welty's first collection of short stories, A Curtain of Green. The story is about Sister and how she becomes estranged from her family and ends up living at the post office where she works. Seen by critics as quality Southern literature, the story comically captures family relationships. Like most of her short stories, Welty masterfully captures Southern idiom and places importance on location and customs. "A Worn Path" was also published in The Atlantic Monthly and A Curtain of Green. It is seen as one of Welty's finest short stories, winning the second-place O. Henry Award in 1941.

Welty's debut novel, The Robber Bridegroom (1942), deviated from her previous psychologically inclined works, presenting static, fairy-tale characters. Some critics suggest that she worried about "encroaching on the turf of the male literary giant to the north of her in Oxford, Mississippi—William Faulkner", and therefore wrote in a fairy-tale style instead of a historical one. Most critics and readers saw it as a modern Southern fairy-tale and noted that it employs themes and characters reminiscent of the Grimm Brothers' works.

Immediately after the murder of Medgar Evers in 1963, Welty wrote Where Is the Voice Coming From?. As she later said, she wondered: "Whoever the murderer is, I know him: not his identity, but his coming about, in this time and place. That is, I ought to have learned by now, from here, what such a man, intent on such a deed, had going on in his mind. I wrote his story—my fiction—in the first person: about that character's point of view". Welty's story was published in The New Yorker soon after Byron De La Beckwith's arrest.

Winner of the Pulitzer Prize for Fiction, The Optimist's Daughter (1972) is believed by some to be Welty's best novel. It was written at a much later date than the bulk of her work. As poet Howard Moss wrote in The New York Times, the book is "a miracle of compression, the kind of book, small in scope but profound in its implications, that rewards a lifetime of work". The plot focuses on family struggles when the daughter and the second wife of a judge confront each other in the limited confines of a hospital room while the judge undergoes eye surgery.

Welty gave a series of addresses at Harvard University, revised and published as One Writer's Beginnings (Harvard, 1983). It was the first book published by Harvard University Press to be a  New York Times Best Seller (at least 32 weeks on the list), and runner-up for the 1984 National Book Award for Nonfiction.

In 1992, she was awarded the Rea Award for the Short Story for her lifetime contributions to the American short story. Welty was a charter member of the Fellowship of Southern Writers, founded in 1987. She also taught creative writing at colleges and in workshops. She lived near Jackson's Belhaven College and was a common sight among the people of her home town.

Welty personally influenced several young Mississippi writers  in their careers including Richard Ford, Ellen Gilchrist, and Elizabeth Spencer. She was a Charter member of the Fellowship of Southern Writers.

Literary criticism related to Welty's fiction
Welty was a prolific writer who created stories in multiple genres. Throughout her writing are the recurring themes of the paradox of human relationships, the importance of place (a recurring theme in most Southern writing), and the importance of mythological influences that help shape the theme.

Welty said that her interest in the relationships between individuals and their communities stemmed from her natural abilities as an observer. Perhaps the best examples can be found within the short stories in A Curtain of Green. "Why I Live at the P.O." comically illustrates the conflict between Sister and her immediate community, her family. This particular story uses lack of proper communication to highlight the underlying theme of the paradox of human connection. Another example is Miss Eckhart of The Golden Apples, who is considered an outsider in her town. Welty shows that this piano teacher's independent lifestyle allows her to follow her passions, but also highlights Miss Eckhart's longing to start a family and to be seen by the community as someone who belongs in Morgana. Her stories are often characterized by the struggle to retain identity while keeping community relationships.

Place is vitally important to Welty. She believed that place is what makes fiction seem real, because with place come customs, feelings, and associations. Place answers the questions, "What happened? Who's here? Who's coming?" Place is a prompt to memory; thus the human mind is what makes place significant. This is the job of the storyteller. “A Worn Path” is one short story that proves how place shapes how a story is perceived. Within the tale, the main character, Phoenix, must fight to overcome the barriers within the vividly described Southern landscape as she makes her trek to the nearest town. "The Wide Net" is another of Welty's short stories that uses place to define mood and plot. The river in the story is viewed differently by each character. Some see it as a food source, others see it as deadly, and some see it as a sign that "the outside world is full of endurance".

Welty is noted for using mythology to connect her specific characters and locations to universal truths and themes. Examples can be found within the short story "A Worn Path", the novel Delta Wedding, and the collection of short stories The Golden Apples. In "A Worn Path", the character Phoenix has much in common with the mythical bird. Phoenixes are said to be red and gold and are known for their endurance and dignity. Phoenix, the old Black woman, is described as being clad in a red handkerchief with undertones of gold and is noble and enduring in her difficult quest for the medicine to save her grandson. In "Death of a Traveling Salesman", the husband is given characteristics common to Prometheus. He comes home after bringing fire to his boss and is full of male libido and physical strength. Welty also refers to the figure of Medusa, who in "Petrified Man" and other stories is used to represent powerful or vulgar women.

Locations can also allude to mythology, as Welty proves in her novel Delta Wedding. As Professor Veronica Makowsky from the University of Connecticut writes, the setting of the Mississippi Delta has "suggestions of the goddess of love, Aphrodite or Venus-shells like that upon which Venus rose from the sea and female genitalia, as in the mound of Venus and Delta of Venus". The title The Golden Apples refers to the difference between people who seek silver apples and those who seek golden apples. It is drawn from W. B. Yeats' poem "The Song of Wandering Aengus", which ends "The silver apples of the moon, The golden apples of the sun". It also refers to myths of a golden apple being awarded after a contest. Welty used the symbol to illuminate the two types of attitudes her characters could take about life.

Honors
 1941: O. Henry Award, second place, "A Worn Path"
 1942: O. Henry Award, first place, "The Wide Net"
 1943: O. Henry Award, first place, "Livvie is Back"
 1954: William Dean Howells medal for fiction, The Ponder Heart
 1968: O. Henry Award, first place, "The Demonstrators”
 1969: Fellow of the American Academy of Arts and Sciences
 1970: The Edward MacDowell Medal
 1973: Pulitzer Prize for Fiction, The Optimist's Daughter
 1979: Honorary Doctorate of Letters from University of Illinois at Urbana–Champaign in Urbana, Illinois
 1980: Presidential Medal of Freedom
 1981: Honorary Doctorate of Humane Letters from Randolph-Macon Woman's College in Lynchburg, Virginia
 1983: National Book Award for the first paperback edition of The Collected Works of Eudora Welty
 1983: Invited by Harvard University to give the first annual Massey Lectures in the History of American Civilization, revised and published as One Writer's Beginnings
 1983: St. Louis Literary Award from the Saint Louis University Library Associates
 1985: Achievement Award, American Association of University Women
 1986: National Medal of Arts.
 1990: A recipient of the Governor's Award for Excellence in the Arts, Lifetime Achievement, which was the state of Mississippi's recognition of her extraordinary contribution to American Letters.
 1991: National Book Foundation Medal for Distinguished Contribution to American Letters
 1991: Peggy V. Helmerich Distinguished Author Award. The Helmerich Award is presented annually by the Tulsa Library Trust.
 1992: Rea Award for the Short Story
 1992: PEN/Malamud Award for the Short Story
 1993: Charles Frankel Prize, National Endowment for the Humanities
 1993: Distinguished Alumni Award, American Association of State Colleges and Universities
 1996: Made a Chevalier de la Légion d’honneur by the French government
 1998: First living author to have her works published in the prestigious Library of America series
 2000: America Award for a lifetime contribution to international writing
 2000: Induction into the National Women's Hall of Fame

Commemoration

 In 1990, Steve Dorner named his e-mail program "Eudora", inspired by Welty's story "Why I Live at the P.O." Welty was reportedly "pleased and amused" by the tribute.
 In 1973, the state of Mississippi established May 2 as "Eudora Welty Day".
 Each October, Mississippi University for Women hosts the "Eudora Welty Writers' Symposium" to promote and celebrate the work of contemporary Southern writers.
 Mississippi State University sculpture professor Critz Campbell has designed furniture inspired by Welty, that has been featured in Smithsonian magazine, The New York Times, the Los Angeles Times, The Washington Post and Elle magazine, and on the Discovery Channel.
 A portrait of Eudora Welty hangs in the National Portrait Gallery of the Smithsonian; it was painted by her friend Mildred Nungester Wolfe.
On September 10, 2018, Eudora Welty became the first author honored with a historical marker through the Mississippi Writers Trail. The historical marker was installed at the Eudora Welty House and Garden in Jackson, Mississippi.

Works

Short story collections 
 A Curtain of Green, 1941
 The Wide Net and Other Stories, 1943
 The Golden Apples, 1949
 The Bride of the Innisfallen and Other Stories, 1955
 Thirteen Stories, 1965
 The Collected Stories of Eudora Welty, 1980
 Moon Lake and Other Stories, 1980
 Morgana: Two Stories from The Golden Apples, 1988

Novels 
 The Robber Bridegroom (novella), 1942
 Musical based on the novella
 Delta Wedding, 1946
 The Ponder Heart, 1954
 The Shoe Bird (juvenile), 1964
 Losing Battles, 1970
 The Optimist's Daughter, 1972

Essays 
 The Eye of the Story, 1979
 One Writer's Beginnings, 1984
 On Writing, 2002

See also
 Mississippi literature

Notes

References

Notes

Citations
 Ford, Richard, and Michael Kreyling, eds. Welty: Stories, Collections, & Memoir. New York: Penguin Putnam Inc., 1998. Print.
 Makowsky, Veronica. Eudora Welty. American Writers. Ed. Stephen Wagley. New York: Charles Scribner's Sons, 1998. 343–356. Print.
 Marrs, Suzanne. Eudora Welty: A Biography. Orlando: Harcourt, Inc., 2005. Print. 50–52.
 Welty, Eudora. The Collected Stories of Eudora Welty. Houghton Mifflin Harcourt, 1980. .

Further reading
 Gwin, Minrose. Mourning Medgar: Justice, Aesthetics, and the Local. March 11, 2008. Southern Spaces.

External links

Resources
 Eudora Welty Foundation
 Eudora Welty Society Homepage. Includes resources on Welty and Southern literature.
 Eudora Welty webpage at The Mississippi Writers Page. Presented by the Department of English at the University of Mississippi.
 Eudora Welty Small Manuscripts Collection (MUM00471). Collection owned and maintained by the University of Mississippi Department of Archives and Special Collections.

Writings on
 "Why I Live at the P.O."
 Fiction Writers Review on Eudora Welty's "Why I Live at the P.O."
 1987 Whiting Writers' Award Keynote Speech

1909 births
2001 deaths
20th-century American novelists
20th-century American women writers
20th-century American photographers
American women novelists
American women short story writers
Columbia Business School alumni
Fellows of the American Academy of Arts and Sciences
Deaths from pneumonia in Mississippi
Members of the Junior League
Mississippi University for Women alumni
National Book Award winners
National Humanities Medal recipients
O. Henry Award winners
PEN/Malamud Award winners
Writers from Jackson, Mississippi
People of the New Deal arts projects
Pulitzer Prize for Fiction winners
University of Wisconsin–Madison College of Letters and Science alumni
Works Progress Administration workers
Writers of American Southern literature
20th-century American short story writers
Presidential Medal of Freedom recipients
Novelists from Mississippi
20th-century American women photographers
Fulbright alumni
Members of the American Academy of Arts and Letters